Applebee's Restaurants LLC. is an American company that develops, franchises, and operates the Applebee's Neighborhood Grill + Bar restaurant chain. The Applebee's concept focuses on casual dining, with mainstream American dishes such as salads, chicken, pasta, burgers, and "riblets" (Applebee's signature dish).

History

1980–2006: Founding and going public
The Applebee's chain was founded by Bill and T. J. Palmer in 1980. Their vision was "to create a restaurant that had a neighborhood pub feel to it and could offer friendly service along with quality fare at a lower price than most of their competition." The name “Appleby” was their first choice for this concept, but they found that it had already been registered. They also considered "Cinnamon's" and "Pepper's" before arriving at Applebee's. They opened their first location in Atlanta, Georgia, at the time named T.J. Applebee's Rx for Edibles & Elixirs. They opened a second location outside of Atlanta, Georgia a few years later, and sold the company to  W. R. Grace and Company in 1983. As part of the transaction, Bill Palmer was named president of the Applebee's Division, an indirect subsidiary of W. R. Grace and Company. In that capacity, Palmer guided the operation from its entrepreneurial beginnings to a full-fledged franchise system. He became an Applebee's franchisee in 1985. Bill Palmer died in 2020.

In 1986, the name of the concept was changed to Applebee's Neighborhood Grill & Bar. In 1988, Applebee's International, Inc., became the restaurant chain's franchiser when Kansas City franchisees Abe Gustin and John Hamra purchased the rights to the Applebee's concept from W. R. Grace. In 1989, Applebee's opened their 100th restaurant in Nashville, Tennessee.

In the 1990s Applebee's became one of the largest sit-down restaurant chains in the United States, and it began trading publicly in November 1991. In 1998, Applebee's opened its 1000th restaurant.

2007–present: Acquisition by IHOP 

On July 16, 2007, IHOP Corp. announced that it agreed to buy Applebee's International for about $2.1 billion. Applebee's shareholders would receive $25.50 in cash per share, representing a 4.6% premium to the closing price on July 13, 2007.

The acquisition was completed on November 29, 2007, after which IHOP Corp. was renamed DineEquity. The combined company became the largest full-service restaurant company in the world, with more than 3,250 locations. A major goal for the new ownership was to revitalize the chain, as well as shift towards a franchise model for the majority of its locations.

In 2013, the chain faced an uproar on the Internet after firing a waitress who posted a picture of a customer's receipt that had a rude note written on it objecting to a required gratuity, and then poorly handling their response to the incident.

On August 11, 2017, DineEquity announced that Applebee's would close between 105 and 135 locations by the end of the year. Same-store sales decreased 7% in the previous quarter.

In-late 2017, Applebee's began to place an increased focus on promotions involving low-cost cocktails, including a $1 margarita promotion dubbed the "Dollarita" in October, and $1 Long Island iced tea (promoted as "L.I.T.s") in December. The drinks would serve as a loss leader, with customers subsequently upsold towards higher-priced food products. Despite hesitation by some franchisees to participate, the promotions were associated with a major increase in traffic at some locations, and prompted the chain to offer similar promotions later on. Dine Brands' new CEO Steve Joyce credited the promotions with having helped influence a major financial turnaround at the company, noting that almost all customers who ordered one also ordered food, and that some customers also moved towards the other cocktails on its menu.

As of December 31, 2019, there were 1,787 restaurants operating system-wide in the United States and 15 other countries, including 69 that are company owned and 1,718 that are franchised. United States locations have steadily declined in recent years and as of December 26, 2022, there were 1,586 locations.

Advertising 
As part of the company's marketing campaign and slogan, Wanda Sykes was hired in 2007 to voice the chain's new mascot, the Applebee's Apple. The character appears in commercials touting Applebee's various specials and stating the new slogan "Together is good" or saying "Get it together, baby!" as the slogan appears at the bottom right of the screen. A new campaign started on February 25, 2008, without Sykes' character (the spokesapple), with the slogan "It's a whole new neighborhood." The commercials used both the original and new logos. In 2009 Applebee's changed its slogan again to "There's no place like the neighborhood."

From 2012 to 2016 Applebee's aired an advertising campaign focusing on fresh ingredients and new dishes, narrated by Jason Sudeikis, featuring the slogan "See you tomorrow."

In 2012, Applebee's partnered with the country group Zac Brown Band on a Veteran's Day-themed "Thank You Movement" campaign to honor members of the U.S. military. The band's song "Chicken Fried" has also been featured in a Applebee's commercial; in February 2022, Applebee's pulled its advertising from CNN after an incident where an inappropriately timed split-screen commercial break featured live footage of the 2022 Russian Invasion of Ukraine shown alongside the ad.

In late September 2017 Applebee's brought back its most famous slogan from the early-to-mid 2000s, "Eatin' Good in the Neighborhood."  In 2019, Applebee's advertising fees accounted for 165.5 million U.S. dollars.

In 2021, after having removed it due to the impact of the COVID-19 pandemic, Applebee's restored its Oreo Cookie Shake to its menu. The chain and beverage had been mentioned in Walker Hayes' song "Fancy Like", which was subsequently featured in a new Applebee's commercial as well.

Controversies

Side-work compensation 
Since 2006, Applebee's and its servers have been engaged in a lawsuit over hourly wages. The servers, who received a federal minimum wage of $2.13 per hour as tipped employees, allege that the company requires them to spend 20% of their time doing non-serving labor, for which they should be paid the federal minimum wage of $7.25 per hour. The case has gone through several stages, including a judicially mandated binding arbitration session.

In September 2012, a judge in Illinois ruled in favor of the Applebee's employees and will evaluate damages at a later date.

References

External links 

 

1980 establishments in Georgia (U.S. state)
Companies based in Glendale, California
Multinational restaurant chains
Restaurant chains in the United States
Restaurants established in 1980
1991 initial public offerings
2007 mergers and acquisitions
Restaurant franchises